The 1996 Italian general election was held on 21 April 1996 to elect members of the Chamber of Deputies and the Senate of the Republic. Romano Prodi, leader of the centre-left The Olive Tree, won the election, narrowly defeating Silvio Berlusconi, who led the centre-right Pole for Freedoms.

For the election, the Northern League of Umberto Bossi ran alone after having left the Berlusconi I Cabinet in 1994, causing a crisis which drove President Oscar Luigi Scalfaro to appoint a technocratic cabinet led by Lamberto Dini, which in turn lost its parliamentary support in 1995, forcing Scalfaro to dissolve the Italian Parliament. The Communist Refoundation Party, led by Fausto Bertinotti, made a pre-electoral alliance with The Olive Tree, presenting its own candidates, supported by Prodi's coalition, mainly in some safe leftist constituencies, in exchange for supporting Olive Tree candidates on the other ones, and ensuring external support for a Prodi government.

Electoral system 
The intricate electoral system of Italy, nicknamed as Mattarellum after Sergio Mattarella, who was the official proponent, provided a 75% of the seats on the Chamber of Deputies (the lower house) as elected by a plurality voting system, whereas the remaining 25% was assigned by proportional representation with a minimum threshold of 4%. If possible, the method associate on the Senate was even more complicated: 75% of seats by uninominal method, and 25% by a special proportional method that actually assigned the remaining seats to minority parties.

General election

Background 
In December 1994, following the communication of a new investigation from Milan magistrates that was leaked to the press, Umberto Bossi, leader of the Northern League, left the coalition claiming that the electoral pact had not been respected, forcing Berlusconi to resign from office and shifting the majority's weight to the centre-left side. The Northern League also resented the fact that many of its MPs had switched to Forza Italia, allegedly lured by promises of more prestigious portfolios.

Berlusconi remained as caretaker prime minister for a little over a month until his replacement by a technocratic government headed by Lamberto Dini. Dini had been a key minister in the Berlusconi cabinet, and Berlusconi said the only way he would support a technocratic government would be if Dini headed it. In the end, Dini was only supported by most opposition parties and not by Forza Italia and Northern League.

In December 1995, Dini resigned as Prime Minister and President Oscar Luigi Scalfaro decided to begin consultations to form a government, supported by all the parties in the Italian Parliament to make constitutional reforms. In a TV debate on 19 January 1996, both Silvio Berlusconi and Democratic Party of the Left leader Massimo D'Alema supported constitutional reforms; however, there were many problems on this theme in both coalition, as Gianfranco Fini and Romano Prodi wanted a snap election, not sure that the reforms would be helpful for the country. On 16 February 1996, a snap election was called.

Campaign 
On 19 February 1996, the outgoing Prime Minister Lamberto Dini announced that he would run in the election with a new party allied with The Olive Tree rather than Berlusconi's Pole of Freedoms. Shortly after, Berlusconi claimed that Dini "copied our electoral programme".

Another important declaration was that of Umberto Bossi, the leader of the regionalist Northern League, which was very important in 1994 to help Berlusconi winning the election. Bossi said that his party would not support Berlusconi anymore and run alone in the election. At the same time, Prodi's coalition made a pre-electoral agreement with Communist Refoundation Party in which Fausto Bertinotti's party undertook to support Prodi's government after the election in case of no parliamentary majority.

On 25 March 1996, Berlusconi organised a manifestation in Milan against taxes (The Tax Day) attended by many Milanese artisans; on the same day in Turin, Prodi was heavily contested during his electoral speech and accused of not wanting to lower taxes.

Main coalitions and parties

Coalitions' leaders

Results

Chamber of Deputies

Overall results

Proportional and FPTP results

Senate of the Republic

Maps

Notes

References

External links 
 Minister of Internal Affairs of Italy: 1996 Election Results, Chamber of Deputies (compressed ZIP file)
 Minister of Internal Affairs of Italy: 1996 Election Results, Senate of the Republic (compressed ZIP file)

General election
April 1996 events in Europe
1996